Fedor Vasilievich Tokarev (2 June 1871 [14 June in old Russian calendar] – 6 March 1968) was a Russian weapons designer and deputy of the Supreme Soviet of the USSR from 1937 to 1950.

Career
Outside the former Soviet Union he is best known as the designer of the Tokarev TT-30 and TT-33 self-loading pistol and the Tokarev SVT-38 and SVT-40 self-loading rifle, both of which were produced in large numbers during fighting on the Eastern Front of World War II. For his contributions to Soviet arms design Tokarev received the Hero of Socialist Labor award and the USSR State Prize.

He also designed the prototype of the FT-1 / ФТ-1 panoramic camera (FT stands for: Fotoapparat Tokareva / Фотоаппарат Токарева).

Timeline

 1888 – Admitted to the Military Vocational School at Novocherkassk; age 17
 1892 – Graduated as Cossack noncommissioned officer and sent to the 12th Don Cossack Regiment as an armorer-artificer; age 21.
 1896 – Returned to Novecherkassk as Master Armorer Instructor; age 25. Applied for admittance to the Military Technical School.
 1900 – Graduated as a Cossack commissioned officer, age 29, and returned to his old unit, the 12th Don Cossack Regiment as Master Gunsmith.
 1910 – Submitted his version of a conversion of the bolt-action Model 1891 Mosin–Nagant rifle to semi-automatic fire, which merited official testing, age 39.
 1927 – Designed Tokarev Model 1927 submachine gun prototype.
 1940–41 – Defended habilitation in technical sciences. Received the Hero of Socialist Labor award and the USSR State Prize.

Tokarev's son Nikolai (1899–1972) also became a prominent firearms designer. He worked for several decades in Tula and designed several machine guns and anti-aircraft guns that were used by the Soviet Army in the 1930s–1940s.

See also 
 List of Russian inventors

References

Further reading
 

1871 births
1968 deaths
Russian people of World War II
Firearm designers
Heroes of Socialist Labour
Soviet engineers
Communist Party of the Soviet Union members
Russian inventors
Soviet inventors
People from Rostov Oblast
Members of the Supreme Soviet of the Russian Soviet Federative Socialist Republic, 1938–1947